Padmakar Kashinath Shivalkar (born 14 September 1940) is a former Indian first class cricketer. A slow left-arm orthodox bowler, Shivalkar spent over 20 years playing for Bombay and is the team's highest wicket taker of all time. He was almost 50 when he retired. 

He was unlucky not to be selected for the Indian Test side, but his career coincided with that of Bishan Bedi. He toured Sri Lanka with a strong Indian side in 1973-74, playing in both matches against Sri Lanka and taking four wickets.

His best bowling figures came in the final of the Ranji Trophy in 1972-73, when he took 8 for 16 and 5 for 18 for Bombay against Tamil Nadu. In the previous season's semi-final he had taken 8 for 19 and 5 for 31 against Mysore.

Shivalkar studied at the Siddharth College of Arts, Science and Commerce in Fort, Mumbai.

References

https://m.facebook.com/atherton.cricket/photos/a.831972300211282/3723717367703413/?type=3&source=48 picture source

External links

1940 births
Living people
Indian cricketers
Mumbai cricketers
West Zone cricketers
Durham cricketers